Nimbin may refer to:

 Nimbin, New South Wales, a village in the Northern Rivers area of Australia
 Nimbin (chemical), a chemical found in Azadirachta indica (Neem tree)
 MV Nimbin, merchant ship